Lukas Rosenthal (born 7 July 1988) is a German international rugby union player, playing for the TSV Handschuhsheim in the Rugby-Bundesliga and the German national rugby union team.

He has played rugby since 2000.

He made his debut for Germany against Georgia on 6 February 2010.

After a number of seasons with RK 03 Berlin, Rosenthal opted to join TSV Handschuhsheim for 2011-12.

Honors

Club
 2nd Rugby-Bundesliga
 Champions: 2008

Stats
Lukas Rosenthal's personal statistics in club and international rugby:

Club

 As of 30 April 2012

National team

 As of 23 March 2010

References

External links
 Lukas Rosenthal at scrum.com
  Lukas Rosenthal at totalrugby.de
  Lukas Rosenthal at the DRV website

1988 births
Living people
German rugby union players
Germany international rugby union players
RK 03 Berlin players
TSV Handschuhsheim players
Rugby union number eights